Eumorphobotys is a genus of moths of the family Crambidae.

Species
Eumorphobotys concavuncus (Chen & Zhang, 2018) 
Eumorphobotys eumorphalis (Caradja, 1925)
Eumorphobotys horakae (Chen & Zhang, 2018)
Eumorphobotys obscuralis (Caradja, 1925)

References

Pyraustinae
Crambidae genera
Taxa named by Eugene G. Munroe